Windows XP visual styles are customizations of the graphical user interface of Windows XP. "Luna", "Royale", "Zune", and "Embedded" are codenames of the official visual styles designed for Windows XP by Microsoft. Since Windows XP, themes include the choice of visual styles as well. By default, "Luna" is preinstalled on Windows XP Home and Professional editions, "Royale" is preinstalled on Windows XP Media Center Edition and "Embedded" is preinstalled on Windows Embedded Standard 2009 and Windows Embedded POSReady 2009. In addition to the preinstalled visual styles, Microsoft has released additional ones for download. Third parties have also released visual styles, though these require modification of core Windows components to work. Visual styles are compatible with all Windows XP editions except Starter Edition.

Compared to Desktop Themes in previous versions of Windows such as Microsoft Plus! for Windows 95, Windows 98, and Windows Me, the new visual styles have a greater emphasis on the graphical appeal of the operating system, using saturated colors and bitmaps throughout the interface, with rounded corners for windows.

The visual styles API was substantially expanded in Windows Vista and later. Nevertheless, the API remained heavily underdocumented.

Luna 

"Luna" (the Moon in Latin and various other languages) is the codename for the default visual style of Windows XP. Officially known as "Windows XP style", it is available in three color schemes: blue (default), olive green, and silver. Critics who did not like the theme characterized it as a "Fisher-Price interface". The Luna theme was also present in all pre-reset Windows Vista (Longhorn) builds, but was absent from all post-reset builds starting with build 5098 (apart from very early "Omega-13" post-reset builds 3790, 5000, 5001, and early Beta 1 builds 5048 and 5049).

Luna Beta 

Luna Beta is an earlier version of the Luna theme that was first previewed at CES 2001 and included in beta builds from builds 2428 to 2465, and later appeared in the leaked source code of Windows XP in September 2020. Officially known as "Whistler style", it is mostly similar to the final Luna theme, with some slight differences (such as the scrollbar being brighter). This theme is unofficially available as a separate theme made by enthusiasts.

Windows Classic 

Officially titled "Windows Classic style", this is the built-in look and feel that was also used in previous versions of Windows. It is used when the theme service is disabled and in certain other scenarios, such as Win32 console windows or booting the system in Safe mode. Classic style widgets are also used for applications that are not theming-aware even though theming is enabled. It is less CPU-intensive and offers better performance, due to which it is also used by default on Windows Server 2003 through 2008 R2.

Compared to other visual styles, it supports greater color and font customization options. Windows XP includes 22 preset color schemes for the classic style. Four of them are optimized for the visually impaired. "Windows Standard" scheme was the default color scheme of Windows ME and Windows 2000 and appeared on Windows Vista and Windows 7 although in the latter, it was renamed "Windows Classic". A slightly darker variant of the Standard scheme, called "Windows Classic", was the default color scheme of Windows 98 (albeit with a dark blue desktop background instead of green, much like the pre-release versions of Windows 2000) and appeared on Windows Vista but not Windows 7. Other schemes appeared in the previous versions of Windows. The style was removed from Windows Server 2012 and Windows 8, however, it still exists internally for backward compatibility purposes.

Royale 

Royale (also known as Energy Blue and Media Center style) was originally designed for Windows XP Media Center Edition 2005, and was ported to Windows XP Tablet PC Edition 2005. It is accompanied by a new wallpaper (inspired by Windows XP Bliss).  It presents a relucent, vivid and faux-reflective color scheme with intense blue and green colors.

Royale was originally made available in December 2004. On April 7, 2005, Microsoft New Zealand had made the Royale theme and the wallpapers for the New Zealand theme available for download for all editions of XP through Windows Genuine Advantage on its website but no longer exists in 2019. Because of the freeware nature of this package, it had also been available on software download websites, such as Softpedia at one time.

Microsoft did also release a Windows Media Player visualization and skin at one time. The skin was released in Experience Pack for Tablet PC and was available for free, but the installer only installed it on Windows XP Tablet PC Edition devices, for which it was licensed.

Royale Noir 

Royale Noir looks like a darkened version of Royale, having a blackish and bluish to purple tint. Royale Noir has a black Start button, which changes to green when the mouse hovers over it. As Royale Noir was leaked and not finalized by Microsoft, it has been noted for some imperfections.

Zune 

A few weeks after Royale Noir was leaked, Zune was officially released in a theme package to accompany the release of Microsoft's new Zune media player. In terms of style, Zune resembles Royale and Royale Noir, particularly the latter. It displays a brown to light shadow style and is the first publicly released visual style for Windows XP to include a differently colored Start button from the green XP.

Embedded 

Windows Embedded Standard 2009 and Windows Embedded POSReady 2009 came with a dedicated visual style called Embedded. It is similar to Royale, featuring a mix of dark blue colors.

Watercolor 

Codenamed "Business" and "Professional", and officially known as "Watercolor button style", Watercolor is a placeholder theme present in pre-release builds prior to Beta 2 as well as the leaked source code of Windows XP in September 2020. The theme more closely resembles Windows Classic, featuring sharp edges and similar window proportions. It features a primarily blue and white style with mostly flat shading and retains certain UI elements from the Classic theme style. This theme is unofficially available as a separate theme made by enthusiasts.

Mallard 

Officially known as "Sample Test Visual Style", Mallard is a theme that was designed as a decoy to show to the public during Beta 2's development while designers privately worked on Luna. It was present in certain builds given out to testers, all of which eventually leaked onto the internet, and later appeared in the leaked source code of Windows XP in September 2020. It features two color schemes, Chartreuse Mongoose, which features a primarily green and orange style, and Blue Lagoon (internally referred to as Paler), which uses a teal and purple style, though both themes feature an orange start button with a green notification area. This theme is unofficially available as a separate theme made by enthusiasts.

Candy 
Candy is an unannounced and unreleased theme which was found in the leaked source code of Windows XP in September 2020. It was made between builds 2250 and 2257, according to the metadata of the files in the theme. Candy seems to be an imitation of the Aqua theme found in earlier versions of Mac OS X (10.0 to 10.6). According to publicly available screenshots, only some UI elements, such as buttons, scroll bars, and the Start menu, had been redesigned to look like Mac OS X's, while others used the Classic theme style.

Third-party visual styles 
Windows only loads a visual style that bears a valid Microsoft digital certificate. As such, third-party visual styles can only be used if one of the Windows files called uxtheme.dll is altered to allow unsigned visual styles. Microsoft is aware of such a practice and suggests obtaining a newer revision of the patched uxtheme.dll file in case problems occur after Microsoft's own updates to the file have been applied (typically through an OS service pack).

Application support 
Third-party applications can be configured to work with visual styles. By default, the title bar and the window borders of Windows Forms-based applications are rendered using the user's preferred visual style, while the rest of the application's graphical user interface (GUI) is rendered in the Classic style. This is because these two different parts of the GUI are rendered using two different software libraries: the title bar and the window borders ("non-client area" or "user controls") use Windows USER, and the remaining controls ("client area" or "common controls") use version 5.8 of the Common Controls Library. Version 6.0 of the Common Controls Library contains both the user controls and the common controls, and developers may configure the application's user interface to be displayed in the user's currently-selected visual style by forcing it to be rendered using version 6.0 of the library.

See also 
 Windows Aero
 WinCustomize
 WindowBlinds
 StyleXP
 Features new to Windows XP
 Theme (computing)

References 

Windows XP
Microsoft Windows multimedia technology